The Poet Laureate of Alaska also known as Alaska State Writer Laureate is the poet laureate for the U.S. state of Alaska. The first Alaska Poet Laureate, Margaret Mielke, was appointed in 1963. The program expanded to include other kinds of writers in 1996.

List of Poets Laureate
Poets laureate of Alaska include:
 Margaret Mielke (1963-1965)
 Oliver Everette (1965-1967)
 John Haines (1969)
 Ruben Gaines (1973)
 Sheila Nickerson (1977)
 Richard Dauenhauer (1981)
 Joanne Townsend (1988)
 Tom Sexton (1995)

List of State Writer Laureate
 Richard Nelson (2000)
 Anne Hanley (2002-2004)
 Jerah Chadwick (2004-2006)
 John Straley (2006-2008)
 Nancy Lord (2008-2010)
 Peggy Shumaker (2010-2012)
 Nora Marks Dauenhauer (2012-2014)
 Frank Soos (2014-2016)
 Ernestine Hayes (2016-2018)

External links
Poets Laureate of Alaska at the Library of Congress

See also

 Poet laureate
 List of U.S. states' poets laureate
 United States Poet Laureate

References

 
Alaska culture
American Poets Laureate